The Miracle Woman is a 1931 American pre-Code romance film directed by Frank Capra and starring Barbara Stanwyck, David Manners, and Sam Hardy. Based on the play Bless You Sister by John Meehan and Robert Riskin, the film is about a preacher's daughter who becomes disillusioned by the mistreatment of her dying father by his church. Having grown cynical about religion, she teams up with a con man and performs fake miracles for profit. The love and trust of a blind man, however, restores her faith in God and her fellow man. The Miracle Woman was the second of five film collaborations between Capra and Stanwyck. Produced and distributed by Columbia Pictures, the film was reportedly inspired by the life of Aimee Semple McPherson.

Plot
Florence Fallon is outraged when church elders, in order to make way for a younger preacher, fire her minister father after his many years of selfless service. Following her father's death, she tells the congregation what she thinks of their ingratitude and hypocrisy. Her bitter, impassioned speech impresses Bob Hornsby, who convinces her to become a phony evangelist so they can squeeze donations out of gullible believers. Promoted as Sister Fallon, Florence then travels about the country with Bob, who manages her "Temple of Happiness". Soon she attracts a devoted national following, but the religious sham comes tumbling down once she meets and falls in love with John Carson, a blind war veteran.  When Florence is blackmailed by Bob, she tells John of her charade.  John then puts a plan in motion to expose Hornsby and the organization.

Cast

See also 
 Leap of Faith, a 1992 film with a similar plot
  The Miracle Man, 1919 film starring Lon Chaney, with a plot generally identical to the 1992 "Leap of Faith" starring Steve Martin. Only a few minutes of the 1919 film are known to still exist.

References
Notes

Bibliography

External links
 
 
 

1931 films
1931 romantic drama films
American romantic drama films
American black-and-white films
Films about religion
American films based on plays
Films directed by Frank Capra
Columbia Pictures films
Ventriloquism
Films with screenplays by Jo Swerling
1930s English-language films
1930s American films
Films about disability